Claudia Porwik and Linda Wild were the defending champions but did not compete that year.

Naoko Kijimuta and Miho Saeki lost in the final 7–5, 6–4 against Yuko Hosoki and Kazue Takuma.

Seeds
Champion seeds are indicated in bold text while text in italics indicates the round in which those seeds were eliminated.

 Rika Hiraki /  Nana Miyagi (first round)
 Sung-Hee Park /  Shi-Ting Wang (semifinals)
 Naoko Kijimuta /  Miho Saeki (champions)
 Silke Meier /  Louise Pleming (quarterfinals)

Draw

References
 1996 Nokia Open Doubles Draw

Doubles